Erinaceidae  is a family in the order Eulipotyphla, consisting of the hedgehogs and moonrats. Until recently, it was assigned to the order Erinaceomorpha, which has been subsumed with the paraphyletic Soricomorpha into Eulipotyphla. Eulipotyphla has been shown to be monophyletic; Soricomorpha is paraphyletic because Soricidae shared a more recent common ancestor with Erinaceidae than with other soricomorphs.

Erinaceidae contains the well-known hedgehogs (subfamily Erinaceinae) of Eurasia and Africa and the gymnures or moonrats (subfamily Galericinae) of South-east Asia. This family was once considered part of the order Insectivora, but that polyphyletic order is now considered defunct.

Characteristics
Erinaceids are generally shrew-like in form, with long snouts and short tails. All but one species have five toes in each foot, in some cases with strong claws for digging, and they have large eyes and ears. Hedgehogs possess hair modified into sharp spines to form a protective covering over the upper body and flanks, while gymnures have only normal hair. Most species have anal scent glands, but these are far better developed in gymnures, which can have a powerful odor.

Erinaceids are omnivorous, with the major part of their diet consisting of insects, earthworms, and other small invertebrates. They also eat seeds and fruit, and occasionally birds' eggs, along with any carrion they come across. Their teeth are sharp and suited for impaling invertebrate prey. The dental formula for erinaceids is: 

Hedgehogs are nocturnal, but gymnures are less so, and may be active during the day. Many species live in simple burrows, while others construct temporary nests on the surface from leaves and grass, or shelter in hollow logs or similar hiding places. Erinaceids are solitary animals outside the breeding season, and the father plays no role in raising the young.

Female erinaceids give birth after a gestation period of around six to seven weeks. The young are born blind and hairless, although hedgehogs begin to sprout their spines within 36 hours of birth.

Evolution
Erinaceids are a relatively primitive group of placental mammals, having changed little since their origin in the Eocene. The so-called 'giant hedgehog' (actually a gymnure) Deinogalerix, from the Miocene of Gargano Island (part of modern Italy), was the size of a large rabbit, and may have eaten vertebrate prey or carrion, rather than insects.

Classification

Order Eulipotyphla
†Family Amphilemuridae
†Genus Alsaticopithecus
†Genus Amphilemur
†Genus Gesneropithex
†Genus Macrocranion
†Macrocranion germonpreae
†Macrocranion junnei
†Macrocranion nitens
†Macrocranion robinsoni
†Macrocranion tenerum
†Macrocranion vandebroeki
†Genus Pholidocercus
†Pholidocercus hassiacus
Family Erinaceidae
 †Genus Silvacola
†Silvacola acares
 †Genus Oligoechinus
 Subfamily Erinaceinae
 †Genus Amphechinus
 †Amphechinus akespensis
 †Amphechinus arverniensis
 †Amphechinus baudelotae
 †Amphechinus edwardsi
 †Amphechinus ginsburgi
 †Amphechinus golpeae
 †Amphechinus horncloudi
 †Amphechinus intermedius
 †Amphechinus kreuzae
 †Amphechinus major
 †Amphechinus microdus
 †Amphechinus minutissimus
 †Amphechinus robinsoni
 †Amphechinus taatsiingolensis
 Genus †Ladakhechinus
 †Ladakhechinus iugummontis
 Genus Atelerix
 Four-toed hedgehog, Atelerix albiventris
 North African hedgehog, Atelerix algirus
 Southern African hedgehog, Atelerix frontalis
 Somali hedgehog, Atelerix sclateri
 Genus Erinaceus
 Amur hedgehog, Erinaceus amurensis
 Southern white-breasted hedgehog, Erinaceus concolor
 European hedgehog, Erinaceus europaeus
 Northern white-breasted hedgehog, Erinaceus roumanicus
 Genus Hemiechinus
 Long-eared hedgehog, Hemiechinus auritus
 Indian long-eared hedgehog, Hemiechinus collaris
 Genus Mesechinus
Daurian hedgehog, Mesechinus dauuricus
 Hugh's hedgehog, Mesechinus hughi
Gaoligong forest hedgehog, Mesechinus wangi
Small-toothed forest hedgehog, Mesechinus miodon
 Genus Paraechinus
 Desert hedgehog, Paraechinus aethiopicus
 Brandt's hedgehog, Paraechinus hypomelas
 Indian hedgehog, Paraechinus micropus 
 Bare-bellied hedgehog, Paraechinus nudiventris
 Subfamily Galericinae
 †Genus Deinogalerix
 †Deinogalerix brevirostris
 †Deinogalerix freudenthali
 †Deinogalerix intermedius
 †Deinogalerix koenigswaldi
 †Deinogalerix minor
 Genus Echinosorex
 Moonrat, Echinosorex gymnura
 †Genus Galerix
†Galerix aurelianensis
†Galerix exilis
†Galerix kostakii
†Galerix remmerti
†Galerix rutlandae
†Galerix saratji
†Galerix stehlini
†Galerix symeonidisi
†Galerix uenayae
 Genus Hylomys
 Long-eared gymnure, Hylomys megalotis
 Dwarf gymnure, Hylomys parvus
 Short-tailed gymnure or Lesser Moonrat, Hylomys suillus
 Genus Neohylomys
 Hainan gymnure, Neonylomys hainanensis
 Genus Neotetracus
 Shrew gymnure, Neotetracus sinensis
 Genus Podogymnura
 Dinagat gymnure, Podogymnura aureospinula
 Eastern Mindanao gymnure, Podogymnura intermedia
 Podogymnura minima
 Mindanao gymnure, Podogymnura truei

References

 
Mammal families
Extant Eocene first appearances
Taxa named by Gotthelf Fischer von Waldheim